Chronicle is a 2012 American found footage superhero thriller film directed by Josh Trank with a screenplay by Max Landis from a story they both co-wrote. It follows three Seattle high school seniors, bullied Andrew (Dane DeHaan), his cousin Matt (Alex Russell), and more popular Steve (Michael B. Jordan), who form a bond after gaining telekinetic powers from an unknown object and using them for fun, although Andrew begins going down a darker path.

Chronicle premiered at the Gérardmer Film Festival on January 28, 2012, and released in the United States on February 3, 2012 by 20th Century Fox. The film grossed $126.6 million at the international box office, against a budget of $15 million. The film received generally positive reviews with praise for the premise, and received a nomination for Best Science Fiction Film at the 39th Saturn Awards.

Plot
Seattle teenager Andrew Detmer is constantly picked on by bullies and abused by his alcoholic father Richard, while also coping with his loving mother Karen's battle with cancer. His only friend is his maternal cousin, Matt Garetty. Inspired by Matt's on-and-off girlfriend Casey, Andrew buys a camera to make a video diary about his situation.

Matt invites Andrew to a party to help him mingle, but his filming causes an altercation with an attendee and he leaves. Popular student Steve Montgomery finds Andrew outside and asks him to come record a large hole he and Matt came across in the woods. The three journey down the hole through a small tunnel where they discover a glowing crystalline object. The object suddenly begins to react violently and the camera shorts out.

Weeks later, Andrew videotapes him, Matt, and Steve having developed telekinetic abilities, but suffer nosebleeds when they overexert themselves. Unable to revisit the hole after it is closed off by police, they start using their abilities to play pranks on people in a shopping center. However, this goes too far when Andrew telekinetically pushes a rude motorist off the road into a nearby pond. After the trio manage to save the man from drowning, Matt insists that they restrict use of their powers, particularly against living beings.

Steve discovers they have flight abilities and the trio agree to fly around the world together following graduation, with Andrew in particular desiring to visit Tibet. Steve encourages Andrew to enter the school talent show, using his powers as a magic act. This amazes their peers, and Andrew relishes his newfound popularity at a house party, but the night ends in disaster when a drunken Andrew goes upstairs to have sex with a classmate who he subsequently vomits on. Steve, who has taken over the camera, accidentally offends the humiliated Andrew when trying to lighten the mood.

Richard views the party footage on Andrew's camera and confronts him. In retaliation, Andrew uses his powers to violently repel him and flees the house, then creates a storm in his increased agitation. This causes Steve and Matt to suffer nosebleeds, indicating their powers are symbiotic. While Matt ignores his, Steve flies out to find Andrew sobbing in the middle of a storm. He attempts to console him, but Andrew becomes increasingly frustrated before Steve is suddenly struck by lightning and killed. At Steve's funeral, Matt cuts ties with Andrew after questioning him on the suspicious circumstances of Steve's death. Andrew denies responsibility, but later privately begs forgiveness at Steve's grave.

Andrew is once again ostracized at school due to the party incident. After using his powers to rip teeth out of a bully's mouth, Andrew begins to identify as an apex predator and rationalizes that he should not feel guilty for using his powers to hurt those weaker than him. Desperate to pay for his mother's medication, Andrew disguises himself with his father's firefighter gear and uses his powers to steal money. He kills some local thugs and robs them, but while robbing a gas station, he inadvertently causes an explosion that puts him in the hospital. At his bedside, a distraught Richard informs a seemingly-unconscious Andrew that Karen has died and angrily blames Andrew for her death. As his father is about to strike him, Andrew awakens and abruptly grabs his arm before blowing out the wall of the room.

Elsewhere, Matt experiences a severe nosebleed and senses Andrew is in trouble. Seeing a news alert on TV about a mysterious explosion downtown, he and Casey head to the hospital. There, Andrew attempts to drop Richard to his death, but Matt flies up and saves him. Enraged by this, Andrew targets Matt and Casey. After ensuring Casey's safety, Matt attempts to reason with Andrew at the Space Needle, but Andrew is too far gone and attacks Matt while also taking out his rage on Downtown, crashing through buildings and hurling vehicles. Eventually, the two wind up in a plaza where police surround them. Andrew's rage reaches a breaking point and he begins to destroy the buildings around him. Realizing that Andrew can't be stopped or reasoned with, Matt reluctantly impales Andrew with a spear from a nearby statue, killing him instantly. Despite his injuries, Matt was able to fly away before the police can reach him.

Some time later, Matt lands in Tibet with Andrew's camera, tearfully apologizing to him while vowing to use his powers for good and find out what happened in the hole. He points the camera at a Tibetan monastery in the distance before flying away, leaving the camera behind.

Cast
 Dane DeHaan as Andrew Detmer
 Alex Russell as Matt Garetty
 Michael B. Jordan as Steve Montgomery
 Michael Kelly as Richard Detmer
 Ashley Hinshaw as Casey Letter
 Bo Petersen as Karen Detmer
 Anna Wood as Monica
 Rudi Malcolm as Wayne
 Luke Tyler as Sean
 Crystal-Donna Roberts as Samantha
 Adrian Collins as Costly
 Grant Powell as Howard
 Armand Aucamp as Austin
 Nicole Bailey as Cala

Production

Development
Josh Trank had conceived the idea for Chronicle in high school and spent the following years generating ideas for the film. Up-and-coming screenwriter Jeremy Slater had collaborated with Trank while working on an unmade spec script. By 2010, Slater had moved on, leading to Trank contacting Max Landis, who agreed to co-write the film. The first draft of the script was written in three weeks after Landis had pitched the film behind Trank's back. Trank's original draft had the character of Steve being hit by a plane and dying in the middle of the second act. Landis removed this from his revisions, which "solved the entire second act". 20th Century Fox bought the rights to the project and greenlit the film with Trank serving as director in January 2011.

Production
For budgetary reasons, the film was shot primarily in Cape Town, South Africa, with Film Afrika Worldwide, as well as in Vancouver, Canada. Trank cited the films Akira, Carrie and The Fury as influences on Chronicle. Filming started in May 2011 and continued for eighteen weeks, ending in August 2011. Cinematographer Matthew Jensen used the Arri Alexa video camera to shoot the film and Angenieux Optimo and Cook s4 lenses. Postproduction techniques were used to give it a "found footage" look. A cable cam rig was used for a shot in which the character Andrew levitates his camera 120 feet into the air. The Arri Alexa camera was mounted on a skateboard to simulate Andrew's camera sliding across a floor. Stuntmen were suspended from crane wire rigs for flying scenes, with green screen special effects used for closeups of the actors. Andrew's video camera in the movie is a Canon XL1 MiniDV, and he later switches to an HD camera that resembles a Canon Vixia HF M30. His "Seattle" bedroom is actually a set that was constructed on a film studio stage in Cape Town. Because in South Africa, vehicles drive on the left side of the road and have steering wheels on the right side, American-style vehicles had to be shipped in for the production. DVD dailies were provided to the director and cinematographer by the Cape Town firm HD Hub.

According to Josh Trank, Max Landis was banned from set during production and Trank has not spoken to him since 2012. Trank confirmed this on Twitter in light of Landis' sexual and emotional abuse accusations.

Release

Chronicle opened in 2,907 theaters in the United States and Canada on February 3, 2012. Box office watchers expected the film to gross $15 million for its opening weekend, the Super Bowl weekend, while Fox projected to receive around $8 million. By its first day the film had earned an estimated $8.65 million and finished the weekend as the top film with $22 million, surpassing The Woman in Black ($21 million) and The Grey ($9.5 million) to become the fourth-highest Super Bowl debut. Chronicle opened as a number one hit internationally, opening in 33 foreign markets such as Australia, China, and the United Kingdom, where it earned the most with $3.5 million. The film grossed $64.6 million in the United States and Canada, and $62 million in other territories, for a worldwide total of $126.6 million. Chronicle was released on DVD and Blu-ray Disc on May 15, 2012. The film was released on DVD and a special "Lost Footage" edition for Blu-ray, which contains additional footage that was not shown in theaters.

Reception

Critical response
The site's critical consensus reads, "Chronicle transcends its found-footage gimmick with a smart script, fast-paced direction, and engaging performances from the young cast." On Metacritic, the film has a weighted average score of 69 out of 100 based on reviews from 31 critics, indicating "generally favorable reviews". Audiences polled by CinemaScore gave the film an average grade of "B" on an A+ to F scale.

Chicago Sun-Times film critic Roger Ebert gave the film three and a half stars out of four, saying, "From [the] deceptively ordinary beginning, Josh Trank's Chronicle grows into an uncommonly entertaining movie that involves elements of a superhero origin story, a science-fiction fantasy and a drama about a disturbed teenager.” Empire critic Mark Dinning gave the film four stars out of five, saying that it is "a stunning superhero/sci-fi that has appeared out of nowhere to demand your immediate attention." Total Film gave the film a five-star review (denoting 'outstanding'): "Believable then bad-ass, it isn't wholly original but it does brim with emotion, imagination and modern implication." Peter Travers of Rolling Stone wrote: "Despite a gimmicky premise, Chronicle fuels its action with characters you can laugh with, understand and even take to heart." Peter Debruge of Variety wrote: "Unlike other mock documentaries, which unconvincingly pass themselves off as real, Chronicle cleverly embraces the format as shorthand for a new kind of naturalism, inviting audiences to suspend disbelief and join in the fantasy of being able to do anything with their minds." Todd McCarthy of The Hollywood Reporter called it "A clever twist on superpowers and hand-held filmmaking that stumbles before the ending."

On the negative side, Andrew Schenker of Slant Magazine gave the film two stars out of four, saying that the film, "offers up little more than a tired morality play about the dangers of power, rehashing stale insights about the narcissism of the documentary impulse."

Awards

The film was nominated for Best Science Fiction Film at 39th Saturn Awards, but lost to The Avengers.

|-
| rowspan="5"| 2012
| rowspan="4"|Chronicle
| Golden Trailer Award for Best Most Original Trailer
| 
|-
| Golden Trailer Award for Best in Show
| 
|-
| IGN Summer Movie Award for Best Sci-Fi Movie 
| 
|-
| IGN Summer Movie Award for Best Movie Poster
| 
|-
| Dane DeHaan
| Golden Schmoes Awards for Breakthrough Performance of the Year
| 
|-
|2013
| Chronicle
| Saturn Award for Best Science Fiction Film
|

Future
Following its successful release, steps toward production of a sequel were taken. Fox hired Landis to write the script for it, but the involvement of Trank as director was unclear. It was reported in October 2012 that Fox was not happy with the script, but in April 2013, Landis said that Fox liked the script—which would be darker in tone—and production was moving along. However, in July 2013, Landis stated that new writers had taken over to write the film, and in March 2014, Fox hired Jack Stanley to write.

Trank commented in 2020 that following the experience of making Chronicle, he was never on board with a sequel. While he thought the sequel script was "fine", he felt that it had "nothing to do with why I wanted to do" the original film, and he did what he could to stall progress on it. "I really didn't ever want to see Chronicle 2 happen. That was my worst nightmare. First of all, I'm not doing it. Second, if somebody else does it, then you know it's gonna be a piece of shit."

In August 2021, a female-led sequel was officially announced by producer John Davis. It would supposedly be set 10 years after the events of the first film and deal with topics such as fake news and coverups.

See also
 Carrie, the first published novel by Stephen King
 Akira, a manga series that was adapted into an anime film of the same name
 Modern Problems, a 1981 dark comedy film where a man is granted the power of telekinesis after a phenomenon event

References

External links

 
 
 

2012 films
2012 action thriller films
2010s coming-of-age films
2012 science fiction action films
2010s science fiction thriller films
2010s superhero films
American action thriller films
American coming-of-age films
American science fiction action films
American science fiction thriller films
American superhero films
2010s English-language films
Camcorder films
2012 directorial debut films
Films about bullying
Films about cancer
Films about child abuse
Films about dysfunctional families
Films about school bullying
Films set in Seattle
Films set in 2012
Films shot in South Africa
Films shot in Vancouver
Found footage films
Teen superhero films
Films about telekinesis
20th Century Fox films
Davis Entertainment films
Dune Entertainment films
Films directed by Josh Trank
Films with screenplays by Max Landis
Supervillain films
2010s American films